Javier Frana was the defending champion but lost in the quarterfinals to Alberto Berasategui.

Berasategui won in the final 6–3, 6–4 against Francisco Clavet.

Seeds

  Alberto Berasategui (champion)
  Àlex Corretja (semifinals)
  Slava Doseděl (semifinals)
  Karel Nováček (second round)
  Gilbert Schaller (second round)
  Álbert Costa (first round)
  Franco Davín (quarterfinals)
  Tomás Carbonell (second round)

Draw

Finals

Top half

Bottom half

External links
 Draw

Singles